Nesna is the administrative centre of Nesna Municipality in Nordland county, Norway.  The village is located on a peninsula on the mainland of Norway, along the Nesnakroken strait, just north of the Ranfjorden and south of the Sjona fjord.  The Norwegian County Road 17 crosses the Ranfjorden on a ferry which docks in the village before heading north along the coastline.  Nesna has regular ferry connections to the nearby islands of Handnesøya, Hugla, and Tomma.

Nesna Church is located in the village, and the village is also host to a campus of Nord University.

Media gallery

References

Nesna
Villages in Nordland